The Bangkok International Trade and Exhibition Centre (BITEC) is a convention and exhibition hall in Bang Na District, Bangkok, Thailand. It hosted the annual Bangkok International Motor Show from 1998 to 2010.

Location 
BITEC is located on Bang Na-Trad Highway, near the intersection with Sukhumvit Road in Bang Na.

References

External links
www.bitec.co.th

Buildings and structures in Bangkok
Convention centers in Thailand
Bang Na district
Buildings and structures completed in 1997
1997 establishments in Thailand